Sparkling Cyanide is a work of detective fiction by British writer  Agatha Christie, first published in the US by Dodd, Mead and Company in February 1945 under the title of Remembered Death and in UK by the Collins Crime Club in the December of the same year under Christie's original title. The US edition retailed at $2.00 and the UK edition at eight shillings and sixpence (8/6).

The novel features the recurring character of Colonel Race for his last appearance to solve the mysterious deaths of 
a married couple, exactly one year apart. The plot of this novel expands the plot of a short story, "Yellow Iris".

Plot summary
One year earlier on 2 November, seven people sat down to dinner at the Luxembourg restaurant. One, Rosemary Barton, never got up; instead she collapsed and died. The coroner ruled her death suicide by poisoning, due to post-flu depression. 

Six months later, her husband George receives anonymous letters saying that Rosemary was murdered. George investigates and decides to repeat the dinner at the same restaurant, with the same guests, plus an actress who looks like his late wife, and who is meant to arrive late and startle the murderer into making a confession. The actress does not arrive and George dies at the table – poisoned, like his wife, by cyanide in his champagne. His death might have been judged as suicide, but George shared his concerns and some of his plan with his friend Colonel Race.

As per their uncle's will, if Rosemary died childless her inherited fortune passed to her younger sister Iris, now a wealthy girl. If Iris dies unmarried, the money would pass to her only relative, her aunt Lucilla Drake. Mrs Drake is a decent person but her son, Victor, is decidedly not. During the investigation it becomes clear that the intended victim was Iris. Colonel Race and Iris's suitor, Anthony Browne, realise that Ruth Lessing, George's trusted secretary, had fallen for Victor a year earlier.

The wrong person dies because of Iris's evening bag and the toast to her, the conjuring trick that saves her life. After the entertainment, George proposes a toast to Iris, when all sip champagne except her, being toasted. When the group leaves the table to dance, Iris drops her bag; a young waiter, retrieving it, misplaces it at the seat adjacent to hers. When, in the dark, the group returns to the table, Iris sits next to her original seat because of the misplaced bag. Everyone else therefore sits one seat away from where they were. George sits at Iris's original seat and drinks the poisoned champagne. When this plot fails, Ruth attempts to run Iris over with a car. Colonel Race, together with the police and Anthony Browne, unravel the truth in time to save Iris from Ruth. Her last attempt at killing Iris is to knock her unconscious in her bedroom, then turn on the fireplace gas, and leave the house. Anthony and Colonel Race rescue Iris in the nick of time.

The anonymous letters to George were sent by Ruth, who then encouraged him to re-stage the dinner at the Luxembourg so that Victor and Ruth could kill Iris, as they killed Rosemary. To support a decision of suicide, Ruth had planted a packet of cyanide in Iris's bag, which packet dropped to the floor when she pulled her handkerchief out, without touching it (no fingerprints on it). Victor acted as a waiter, to drop the poison in the champagne during the show. He was taken at New York at the request of the police.

Characters
Rosemary Barton: Wife of George Barton, who inherited wealth from her godfather. She was killed one year before this story.
George Barton: Husband of Rosemary, who arranges a dinner one year after his wife's death, and is killed at the anniversary dinner.
Colonel Race: Investigator and friend of George Barton.
Iris Marle: Sister of Rosemary, now wealthy, and the intended victim of a second poisoning attempt at the dinner.
Anthony Browne: Boyfriend of Iris, who works to solve the many attempts to kill her.
Lucilla Drake: Aunt to Rosemary and Iris, who inherits if Iris dies before she marries or turns 21.
Victor Drake: Son of Lucilla Drake, a man with desire to get money without work.
Ruth Lessing: Secretary to George who falls for Victor, and schemes and murders to gain the inherited wealth by killing all those in the list before Victor. Note that Christie used a pun for this ruthless female conspirator.

Short story and novel development and comparison

The plot of this novel is an expansion of a Hercule Poirot short story entitled "Yellow Iris," which had previously been published in issue 559 of the Strand Magazine in July 1937 and in book form in The Regatta Mystery and Other Stories in the US in 1939. It was published in book form in the UK in Problem at Pollensa Bay in 1991.

The full-length novel has Colonel Race as the central investigative character in place of Poirot, who had that role in the short story. The novel uses the basics of the short story, including the method of the poisoning, but changes the identity of the culprit(s) – not for the first time, when Christie rewrote her own work.

Literary significance and reception
The book was not reviewed in The Times Literary Supplement.

Maurice Richardson, in the 13 January 1946 issue of The Observer wrote, "Agatha Christie readers are divided into two groups: first, fans like me who will put up with any amount of bamboozling for the sake of the pricking suspense, the close finish, six abreast, of the suspect race, and the crashing chord of the trick solution; second, knockers who complain it isn't cricket and anyway there's nothing to it. Fans, I guarantee will be quite happy with Sparkling Cyanide, a high income group double murder, first of wayward smarty Rosemary, second of dull husband George at his lunatic reconstruction-of-the-crime party. It  is too forced to rank with her best Number One form, but the suspect race is up to scratch and readability is high. Making allowances for six years of spam and cataclysm, quite a credible performance."

An unnamed reviewer in the Toronto Daily Star of 24 February 1945 said, "Suspense is well maintained and suspicion well divided. While this mystery lacks Hercule Poirot, it should nevertheless please all Agatha Christie fans, especially those who like the murders in the fast, sophisticated set."

Robert Barnard: "Murder in the past, previously accepted as suicide. Upper-class tart gets her come-uppance in smart London restaurant, and husband later suffers the same fate. Compulsively told, the strategies of deception smart as a new pin, and generally well up to 'forties standard. But the solution takes more swallowing than cyanided champagne."

Adaptations

TV
In 1983, CBS writers Robert Malcolm Young, Sue Grafton and Steven Humphrey adapted the book into a television film, directed by Robert Michael Lewis, set in modern day California and starring Anthony Andrews as the central character, Tony Browne, with Deborah Raffin as Iris Murdoch, Pamela Bellwood as Ruth Lessing, Josef Sommer as George Barton, David Huffman and June Chadwick as Stephen and Sandra Farraday, Nancy Marchand as Lucilla Drake, and Christine Belford as Rosemary Barton. This adaptation did not feature Colonel Race.

In 1993, the short story that served as the basis for this novel, The Yellow Iris, was adapted for television by Anthony Horowitz and directed by Peter Barber-Fleming  in an episode of the ITV series Agatha Christie's Poirot starring David Suchet.

In late 2003, it was loosely adapted by Laura Lamson for ITV1, again in a modern setting, and involving a football manager's wife's murder. In this adaptation Colonel Race was renamed Colonel Geoffrey Reece, and given a partner, his wife, Dr. Catherine Kendall. The byplay between Reece (played by Oliver Ford Davies) and Kendall (played by Pauline Collins) was somewhat similar to Christie's characters Tommy and Tuppence.

In 2013, it was adapted as an episode of the French television series Les Petits Meurtres d'Agatha Christie.

Radio
In 2012, a three-part adaptation by Joy Wilkinson was broadcast on BBC Radio 4 directed by Mary Peate, with Naomi Frederick as Iris, Amanda Drew as Ruth, Colin Tierney as Anthony, James Lailey as Stephen, Sean Baker as Colonel Race and Jasmine Hyde as Rosemary.

Publication history

 1945, Dodd Mead and Company (New York), February 1945, Hardback, 209 pp
 1945, Collins Crime Club (London), December 1945, Hardback, 160 pp
 1947, Pocket Books (New York), Paperback (Pocket number 451)
 1955, Pan Books, Paperback, 159 pp (Pan number 345)
 1955, Pan Books, Paperback, (Great Pan 156)
 1960, Fontana Books (Imprint of HarperCollins), Paperback, 160 pp
 1978, Ulverscroft Large-print Edition, Hardcover, 358 pp; 
 2010, HarperCollins; Facsimile edition, Hardcover: 160 pages; 

The novel's first true publication was the serialisation in The Saturday Evening Post in eight instalments from 15 July (Volume 216, Number 3) to 2 September 1944 (Volume 217, Number 10) under the title Remembered Death with illustrations by Hy Rubin.

The novel was first serialised, heavily abridged, in the UK in the Daily Express starting on Monday, 9 July 1945 and running for eighteen instalments until Saturday, 28 July 1945. The first instalment carried an uncredited illustration.

References

External links
Sparkling Cyanide at the official Agatha Christie website

1945 British novels
British novels adapted into films
Novels by Agatha Christie
Works originally published in The Saturday Evening Post
Novels first published in serial form
Dodd, Mead & Co. books
British novels adapted into television shows
Restaurants in fiction
Inheritances in fiction